Been Listening is the second full-length LP by London-based folk-rock band Johnny Flynn & The Sussex Wit.  The album was recorded in both London and Seattle, and features collaborations with Laura Marling and Anna Calvi. The album was also released in a 2-disc special edition and on vinyl.

Track listing

References 

2010 albums
Johnny Flynn (musician) albums
Transgressive Records albums